The taphon is a traditional drum of Thailand. It is barrel-shaped with two heads, and is played by the hands and fingers of both hands, much like the more popular congas.

Originally called the Sa Phon, the taphon is used in the classical Thai wind-and-percussion ensemble called piphat. Moreover, it is the most commonly used drum in Thai folk music, and is performed often in Bangkok and Chiang Mai.  Often used to accompany performances in Thai shrines which are meant to entertain the resident god in offering, it is considered a particularly sacred instrument in the Thai culture, and is generally kept in a higher place than other instruments.  In many cases, designs are woven into the middle section of the taphon.

The taphon is very similar to the Cambodian sampho.

An example of the taphon being played:

See also
Piphat
Music of Thailand
Sampho
Congas

References

Hand drums
Thai musical instruments
Sacred musical instruments